The Gwat'sinux or Quatsino, for whom Quatsino Sound on northern Vancouver Island is named, are one of the main subdivisions of the Kwakwaka'wakw peoples.  They were organized into the Quatsino First Nation as a band government during the process of colonization under the Indian Act.

Kwakwaka'wakw
Northern Vancouver Island